The Chiang Wei-shui Memorial Park is a memorial park in Datong District, Taipei, Taiwan. The park commemorates Chiang Wei-shui.

History
The park was originally named as Jinxi Park. It was then renamed and rededicated by the Taipei City Government to commemorate Chiang's efforts in promoting democracy and development of Taiwan on 5 August 2006 in conjunction with the 75th anniversary of Chiang's death in a ceremony attended by Vice President Annette Lu, Premier Su Tseng-chang and Taipei Mayor Ma Ying-jeou.

Architecture
The park spans over an area of 5,060 m2. It features a baroque arched facade and a stale near the entrance.

Transportation
The memorial park is accessible within walking distance south west of Minquan West Road Station of Taipei Metro.

See also
 List of tourist attractions in Taiwan

References

2006 establishments in Taiwan
Buildings and structures in Taipei
Memorial parks in Taiwan